Good Night is a rural locality split between the Bundaberg Region and the North Burnett Region, Queensland, Australia. It is also written as Goodnight.

Geography 
The Burnett River bounds the locality to the south-east and Kallina Creek to the south-west.

The Goodnight Scrub National Park occupies most of the southern part of the locality, which is accessed from Booyal on the Bruce Highway via a low-level bridge over the Burnett River.

There is some rural residential development in the east of the locality and some crop growing in the north. Apart from these the predominant land use is grazing on native vegetation.

History 
Goodnight Scrub State School opened on 28 January 1919 and closed on 1942. A 1942 map suggests it was on Goodnight Scrub Road at approx  in present-day Morganville.

Education 
There are no schools in Good Night. The nearest primary schools are Booyal State School in neighbouring Booyal to the east and Wallaville State School in Wallaville to the north-east. The nearest secondary school is Gin Gin State High School in Gin Gin to the north-east.

Amenities 
The Goodnight Scrub Hall is at 333 Goodnight Scrub Road, now in Morganville.

References 

Bundaberg Region
North Burnett Region
Localities in Queensland